The Lisan Peninsula is a large spit of land that now separates the North and the South basins of the Dead Sea. Its name is Arabic for "tongue". The peninsula, located entirely within Jordanian territory, separates the northern section of the Dead Sea from its shallow southern part. The northern tip is labeled as Cape Costigan, in memory of Christopher Costigan, an Irish explorer who perished in 1835 from heat and thirst after being stranded on the sea for days. He took the first known boat ride on the sea in modern times. The south-western tip is labeled as Cape Molyneux, in memory of Thomas Howard Molyneux, an officer in the British Royal Navy who explored the Dead Sea in August 1847 and perished following his return from the journey.

The dried water strait between the Lisan and the western coast of the Dead Sea is named Lynch Strait, after William Francis Lynch who explored the Dead Sea area in 1848.

See also
 Zahrat adh-Dhraʻ 2

References

Landforms of Jordan
Peninsulas of Asia